Virginie Cueff (born 18 June 1988, in Gouesnou) is a French professional racing cyclist.

Palmarès

2006
2nd Sprint, European Track Championships, Juniors, Athens
3rd 500 m, European Track Championships, Juniors, Athens
2nd European Championship, Track, Scratch, Juniors (F), Athens
3rd Sydney, Team Sprint (AUS)
3rd Moscou, Team Sprint (RUS)
3rd Sydney, Team Sprint (F) (AUS)

2007
3rd 500 m, European Track Championships, U23, Cottbus (GER)

2nd Los Angeles, Team Sprint (F) (USA)

2009
1st Team Sprint, UEC European U23 Track Championships

2010
UEC European U23 Track Championships
1st Team Sprint
2nd  Keirin
2nd  Sprint
3rd  500m Time Trail

2013
3rd Keirin, European Track Championships, Apeldoorn (NED)

2014
South East Asian GP Track (1)
1st Keirin
1st Sprint
South East Asian GP Track (3)
1st Sprint
2nd Keirin
Fenioux Piste International
1st Keirin
1st Team sprint (with Sandie Clair)
2nd Sprint, South East Asian GP Track (2)
Grand Prix de Vitesse de Saint-Denis
2nd Keirin
2nd Sprint
2nd Team Sprint, GP von Deutschland im Sprint (with Sandie Clair)
3rd Sprint, Fenioux Trophy Piste 
3rd Team Sprint, Open des Nations sur Piste de Roubaix (with Sandie Clair)

2015
Grand Prix de Vitesse de Saint-Denis
1st Sprint 
3rd Keirin
Prova Internacional de Anadia
1st Keirin
1st Sprint
6 giorni delle rose - Fiorenzuola
2nd Sprint
3rd Keirin
2nd Keirin, UEC European Track Championships
3rd Sprint, Trofeu CAR Anadia Portugal
3rd Sprint, Open des Nations sur Piste de Roubaix

2016
1st Sprint, Fenioux Piste International

References

External links

1988 births
Living people
French female cyclists
French track cyclists
Cyclists at the 2012 Summer Olympics
Cyclists at the 2016 Summer Olympics
Olympic cyclists of France
Sportspeople from Finistère
Universiade medalists in cycling
Universiade bronze medalists for France
Medalists at the 2011 Summer Universiade
Cyclists from Brittany